Glenn Thomas Suddaby (born 1956) is a United States district judge of the United States District Court for the Northern District of New York.

Biography
Born in Glens Falls, New York, Suddaby received a Bachelor of Arts degree from State University of New York at Plattsburgh in 1980 and a Juris Doctor from Syracuse University College of Law in 1985. He was an Assistant district attorney of Onondaga County District Attorney's Office, New York from 1985 to 1989. He was in private practice in Syracuse, New York, from 1989 to 1992. He was a First chief assistant district attorney of Onondaga County District Attorney's Office, New York from 1992 to 2002. He was United States Attorney for the Northern District of New York from 2002 to 2008.

Federal judicial service
Suddaby is a United States District Judge of the United States District Court for the Northern District of New York. Suddaby was nominated by President George W. Bush on December 11, 2007, to a seat vacated by Lawrence E. Kahn. He was confirmed by the United States Senate on July 22, 2008, and received commission on August 29, 2008. He served as Chief Judge from August 31, 2015, to August 31, 2022.

References

Sources

1956 births
Living people
21st-century American judges
Judges of the United States District Court for the Northern District of New York
New York (state) lawyers
People from Glens Falls, New York
State University of New York at Plattsburgh alumni
Syracuse University College of Law alumni
United States Attorneys for the Northern District of New York
United States district court judges appointed by George W. Bush